The 1990 World Field Archery Championships were held in Loen, Norway.

Medal summary (Men's individual)

Medal summary (Women's individual)

Medal summary (Team)
No Team Events at this championships.

Medal summary (Juniors)
No Junior Events at this championships.

References

E
1990 in Norwegian sport
International archery competitions hosted by Norway
World Field Archery Championships